Khusheh Mehr (also Romanized as Khūsheh Mehr; also known as Khvājeh Āmīr, Khojamir, Khūsheh Mehr-e Khūjeh Mīr, Khūshmehr, and Kūsheh Mehr) is a city in Benajuy-ye Sharqi Rural District of the Central District of Bonab County, East Azerbaijan province, Iran. At the 2006 census, its population was 3,633 in 882 households. The following census in 2011 counted 3,738 people in 1,086 households. The latest census in 2016 showed a population of 3,528 people in 1,071 households; it was the largest village in its rural district.

References 

Bonab County

Populated places in East Azerbaijan Province

Populated places in Bonab County